Peter Hawthorn Ashdown (born 16 October 1934 in Danbury, Essex) is a former motor racing driver. He drove in a single Formula One World Championship Grand Prix, racing a Cooper.

 Ashdown had trained as a vehicle mechanic, and had been a few years in the Royal Air Force when he started racing. First seen in a Dellow with a Ford 10 engine, he continued around 1955 to race in a Lotus Mark IX as a privateer, not being part of any particular racing team.

Prior to Formula One, he was one of the leaders of the British Formula Junior scene, but an accident at Rouen-Les-Essarts in 1958, in which he broke his collarbone, considerably hampered his career. 

He continued racing, and competed in a Formula Two (F2) Cooper-Climax entered by Alan Brown at the 1959 British Grand Prix at Aintree. He finished in 12th position, third of the F2 cars and six laps down. From there he drove a Formula Junior Lola and many small-engined sports cars, winning his class in the 1960 and 1962 1000km Nürburgring. 

He retired in 1962 and focused his efforts on a Vauxhall dealership in Essex.

Complete Formula One World Championship results
(key)

References

1934 births
Living people
English racing drivers
English Formula One drivers
24 Hours of Le Mans drivers
People from Danbury, Essex
Sportspeople from Essex
World Sportscar Championship drivers